The World Para Table Tennis Championships are the world championships for para table tennis where athletes with a disability compete. They are organised by the International Table Tennis Federation (ITTF) on a four-year rotation with the Paralympic Games (every four years).

The first edition was held in 1990 in Assen, Netherlands, the second in 1998, from that the championships was held every four years.

Locations

All-time medal count
As 2022 (including medals won at the 2017 team championships)

See also
International Table Tennis Federation
Table tennis at the Summer Paralympics
World Table Tennis Championships

References

External links
Para table tennis web page at ITTF web site

Table tennis competitions
Table
Para table tennis
Recurring sporting events established in 1990